Leucine rich repeat containing 24 is a protein that, in humans, is encoded by the LRRC24 gene. The protein is represented by the official symbol LRRC24, and is alternatively known as LRRC14OS. The function of LRRC24 is currently unknown. It is a member of the leucine-rich repeat (LRR) superfamily of proteins.

Gene 
In humans, LRRC24 is located on Chromosome 8 (8q24.3). The gene spans approximately 4.66 kb on the opposite strand. LRRC24 is composed of five exons, and only a single gene isoform has been identified.

Protein

General features 
LRRC24 is a transmembrane protein of unknown function. Human LRRC24 consists of 513 amino acids including a 23 amino acid signal peptide. The mature form of the protein has a molecular weight of 52.9 kDa. The isoelectric point of the mature human protein is 7.98 The protein is largely composed of alpha helices.

Domains 
LRRC24 is a single-pass transmembrane protein. The protein consists of six leucine-rich repeats and an immunoglobulin-like domain.

Localization 
LRRC24 is a secreted protein as is evidenced by the presence of a signal peptide. The structure of the protein suggests that it localizes to the cell membrane.

Homology 
LRRC24 is conserved in Euteleostomi with the exception of Aves. Also, based on sequence homology analysis, distant orthologs of LRRC24 are also conserved in invertebrates of phyla Mollusca and Arthropoda. No human paralogs of LRRC24 have been identified.

Expression 
Microarray and in situ hybridization experiments suggest LRRC24 is primarily expressed within the brain. Expression is observed to be especially high within the midbrain, neocortex, and tissues of the limbic system, including the hypothalamus and hippocampal formation.

Interactions 
Protein-protein interactions of LRRC24 implicate the protein with cell signaling, cell migration, and axon guidance. ROBO2 was found to interact with LRRC24. ROBO2 is a member of the Roundabout gene family, which are well known to play a significant role in nervous system development. Also, LRRC24 was found to interact with LRRTM4, a protein believed to be involved in synaptogenesis, as well as the maintenance of the nervous system in vertebrates.

LRRC24 has also been found to interact with IGFBP7, a known regulator of insulin-like growth factors (IGFs). IGFBP7 is also involved in the stimulation of cell adhesion.

Clinical significance 
To date, no study has specifically implicated LRRC24 or the LRRC24 gene with any case of clinical significance.

References 

Genes on human chromosome 8
Membrane proteins